The lesser waterboatman or lesser water boatman (Corixa punctata) is a water-dwelling insect of the order Hemiptera.

Adults normally range in size from 5 to 15 mm long, and are found in ponds, lakes and sometimes even swimming pools. The boatman feeds on algae and dead plant material. They have long hind legs which they use to swim on top of water. These powerful legs are covered in tiny hairs which helps them float on the surface of the water.

They breathe oxygen by trapping air beneath their wing cases when they are on the surface as the oxygen is trapped by tiny hairs. They use trapped air in their physical gill to convert water-borne sounds into airborne sounds that they can hear.

They are similar to Notonecta glauca, the back swimmer by appearance, although these lesser waterboatman are herbivores and swim on their fronts. They are not related to Notonecta glauca, back swimmer, nor to the European Micronecta scholtzi, also known as the "lesser water boatman".

References

Further reading
 Banks, C.J. (1949). "The absorption of water by the eggs of Corixa punctata Illig. (Hemiptera, Corixidae) under experimental conditions." The Journal of Experimental Biology 26: 131–136.
 Short, J.R.T. (1953). "On the musculature of the legs of Corixa punctata (Illig.) Hemiptera." Proceedings of the Royal Entomological Society of London A 28: 31–35.

External links 

 Canterbury Environmental Education Centre, includes images
 Microcosmos.nl - description and images

Corixini
Fauna of the Netherlands
Insects described in 1807